Sir Louis Pierre Rene "Amédée" Maingard de la Ville-ès-Offrans, CBE (21 October 1918 - 1981) was born in Mauritius, then a British colony. During the Second World War, he served with distinction with the British clandestine organization, the Special Operations Executive, supporting the French resistance, and was awarded medals by the British and French governments. After the war he returned to Mauritius and became a successful businessman.

Wartime career

Maingard was studying in London in 1939 at the outbreak of the Second World War and volunteered for the British Army.
After an unrewarding period in the infantry, Maingard joined the Special Operations Executive F section in 1942. He was parachuted into occupied France in April 1943 to join the 'Stationer' circuit run by Squadron Leader Maurice Southgate, initially as radio operator but soon was second-in-command in the circuit, arranging the delivery of weapons, supplies and personnel to the maquisards of the French Resistance.

Southgate was arrested by the Gestapo in May 1944 and sent to the Buchenwald concentration camp. Maingard was fortunate not to be arrested with him.  Southgate's courier, Pearl Witherington and Maingard were with Southgate the day he was arrested, but Witherington said that Maingard was worn out and that he needed to take the afternoon off. While the two of them were picnicking, Southgate was arrested.

Maingard was promoted to major and he and Witherington split the large Stationer circuit into two smaller circuits. Maingard's circuit was named 'Shipwright.' He expanded its size and scope of operations, operating between Poitiers and Montluçon. The official historian of the SOE, M.R.D. Foot, usually sparing in praise, characterized Shipwright as "highly successful." The circuit was especially active in the sabotage that took place on and after D-Day (6 June 1944), supporting the Forces Françaises de l'Intérieur and the arrival of fifty-five men of 1st SAS Regiment for the ill-fated Operation Bulbasket shortly after D-Day.

He continued his work until the liberation of central France, managing to keep the peace among the Gaullists, Communists, British and Americans fighting for the French common cause. He earned the Croix de Guerre from the French government in 1944 and the Distinguished Service Order from the British government in June 1945.

Later career

Maingard returned to Mauritius and helped develop the island's tourism industry, founding Air Mauritius in 1967. He became one of his country's most successful post-war businessmen.

Maingard died in 1981 at the age of 62, just before a boom in the tourist industry that he had helped establish.

Notes

1918 births
1981 deaths
Mauritian military personnel of World War II
Special Operations Executive personnel
Commanders of the Order of the British Empire
Mauritian Knights Bachelor
French military personnel
Mauritian people of French descent